The current coat of arms of Morocco (formally, the royal coat of arms) was introduced on 14 August 1957.

Official description
The government of Morocco describes the coat of arms as follows:

Gules, in chief a demi-sun rising, with 15 rays or on a background azure; supported by a fess in bar enarched vert, fusily or and argent; the whole surcharged by a mullet (pentalpha) vert. The shield ensigned by the Royal Crown of Morocco or, embellished with pearls alternately gules and vert; it is bordered with lamrequins or, sustained on 2 cornucopias and supported by two lions proper: the one in dexter in profile and in sinister affronté.

The shield has a scroll or with a verse from Quran: In Tansourou Allaha Yansouroukoum

Gallery

References

External links
 History of Moroccan emblems - (Archive)

Morocco
National symbols of Morocco
Morocco
Morocco
Morocco
Morocco
Morocco
Moroccan heraldry